The following is a list of notable deaths in March 2018.

Entries for each day are listed alphabetically by surname. A typical entry lists information in the following sequence:
 Name, age, country of citizenship at birth, subsequent country of citizenship (if applicable), reason for notability, cause of death (if known), and reference.

March 2018

1
Bender, 37, Canadian rapper.
Fredrik Bull-Hansen, 90, Norwegian military officer, Chief of Defence (1984–1987).
Colin Campbell, 81, English actor (A Family at War, The Ruth Rendell Mysteries).
Enrique Cárdenas González, 91, Mexican politician, Governor of Tamaulipas (1975–1981), Municipal President of Ciudad Victoria (1968–1971).
Diana Der Hovanessian, 83, American poet and professor (Yerevan State University).
Dorne Dibble, 88, American football player (Detroit Lions), pneumonia.
Jean-Guy Hamelin, 92, Canadian Roman Catholic prelate, Bishop of Rouyn-Noranda (1973–2001).
Anatoly Lein, 86, Russian-born American chess Grandmaster.
Beth Morris, 74, Welsh actress (Son of Dracula).
Arabinda Muduli, 56, Indian musician and Bhajan singer, cardiac arrest.
Michael Paine, 89, American engineer.
Vicente Piquer, 83, Spanish footballer (Valencia, Málaga, national team).
María Rubio, 83, Mexican actress (Cuna de lobos, Imperio de cristal, Querida enemiga).
Orin C. Smith, 75, American coffee executive, President and CEO of Starbucks (2000–2005), pancreatic cancer.
Luigi Taveri, 88, Swiss motorcycle road racer, Grand Prix champion (1962, 1964, 1966), stroke.
Johann Zeitler, 90, German footballer (VfB Bayreuth, SpVgg Bayreuth).

2
Barry Ansell, 70, English footballer (Aston Villa).
James T. Baldwin, 84, American industrial designer and architect.
Maxine Berman, 71, American politician, member of the Michigan House of Representatives (1983–1996), lung cancer.
Adela Calva Reyes, 50–51, Mexican Indigenous writer.
Gordon Challis, 85, New Zealand poet.
Gillo Dorfles, 107, Italian art critic, painter and philosopher.
Ota Filip, 87, Czech novelist and journalist.
Emma Gresham, 92, American teacher and politician.
Billy Herrington, 48, American gay pornographic actor, traffic collision.
Mollie Hunt, 81, English cricketer.
Joseph Israel, 40, American reggae musician, cancer.
Khagendra Jamatia, 64, Indian politician, MLA (since 1988), blood cancer.
Brandon Jenkins, 48, American red dirt singer-songwriter, complications from heart surgery.
Shree Lal Joshi, 86, Indian painter.
Barbara Kiefer Lewalski, 87, American literary scholar.
Jesús López Cobos, 78, Spanish conductor, cancer.
Gerry Lowe, 90, English rugby player (Warrington Wolves).
Cle Newhook, 74, Canadian politician, leader of the NL NDP (1989–1992), cancer.
Ronnie Prophet, 80, Canadian country singer, multiple organ failure.
Craig Raisner, 56, American voice actor (Korgoth of Barbaria).
Carlo Ripa di Meana, 88, Italian politician, Minister of the Environment (1992–1993) and European Commissioner for the Environment (1983–1993).
Omar Sey, 77, Gambian politician and sports administrator, Foreign Minister (1987–1994), President of Gambia Football Federation (2004–2005).
Timothy Shelpidi, 70, Nigerian military officer.
Sammy Stewart, 63, American baseball player (Baltimore Orioles, Boston Red Sox, Cleveland Indians).

3
Sir Roger Bannister, 88, British Olympic middle-distance athlete (1952), doctor and academic, first person to run a sub-four-minute mile, Parkinson's disease.
Clare Beghtol, 76, American-born Canadian information scientist.
Mal Bryce, 74, Australian politician, Deputy Premier of Western Australia (1983–1988).
Alva Campbell, 69, American convicted murderer.
Tônia Carrero, 95, Brazilian actress (Água Viva, Louco Amor), complications from surgery.
Leslie Coffey, 81, Australian Olympic sports shooter (1964).
Jacqueline Desmarais, 89, Canadian billionaire philanthropist.
Frank Doubleday, 73, American actor (Escape from New York, Assault on Precinct 13, Broadcast News), complications from esophageal cancer.
Fred Dugan, 84, American football player (Washington Redskins, San Francisco 49ers).
Renzo Franzo, 103, Italian politician, Deputy (1948–1968).
Kenneth Gärdestad, 69, Swedish songwriter ("Satellit"), pneumonia and influenza following skin cancer and lymphoma.
Jacques Gernet, 96, French sinologist.
Vanessa Goodwin, 48, Australian politician, Attorney-General of Tasmania (2014–2017), brain cancer.
Sabit Hadžić, 60, Bosnian Yugoslav-era basketball player, Olympic bronze medalist (1984) and coach (national team).
Emma Hannigan, 45, Irish author, breast cancer.
Imogene Powers Johnson, 87, American billionaire philanthropist.
Kim Chong-hoh, 82, South Korean politician.
Anthony Lejeune, 89, British writer.
Lin Hu, 90, Chinese general, deputy commander of the PLA Air Force.
Enzo Lippolis, 61, Italian archeologist.
Virgilijus Noreika, 82, Lithuanian opera singer, People's Artist of the USSR (1970).
Franz Pacher, 98, Austrian engineer.
Ivone Ramos, 91, Cape Verdean writer.
Curt Raydon, 84, American baseball player (Pittsburgh Pirates).
Derek Saunders, 90, English footballer (Chelsea F.C.).
Robert Scheerer, 89, American director and actor (Star Trek, Fame, Lend an Ear).
Arthur Stewart, 76, Northern Irish footballer (Glentoran, Derby County, Detroit Cougars).
Ian Stewart, Baron Stewartby, 82, British politician and numismatist.
David Ogden Stiers, 75, American actor (M*A*S*H, Beauty and the Beast, The Dead Zone), bladder cancer.
Yvon Taillandier, 91, French artist.
Daranagama Kusaladhamma Thero, 54, Sri Lankan Buddhist monk, founder of The Buddhist TV.
Jorge Wagensberg Lubinski, 69, Spanish physicist, academic (University of Barcelona), writer and aphorist, founder director of CosmoCaixa.
Ken M. Wallace, 73, British engineering scientist.
Ray Wilkins, 89, English footballer (Derby County).
Yao Xian, 90, Chinese general, commander of the Beijing Military Region Air Force.

4
Javed Abidi, 52, Indian disability rights activist, chest infection.
Davide Astori, 31, Italian footballer (Cagliari, Fiorentina, national team), heart attack.
Elma Bellini, 63, American judge, member of the New York Supreme Court, cancer.
Charles Elbaum, 91, Polish-born American physicist.
John Hollingworth, 87, British politician, MP for Birmingham All Saints (1959–1964).
James Luna, 68, American performance artist, heart attack.
Sir William McAlpine, 6th Baronet, 82, British engineering construction executive, managing director of Sir Robert McAlpine.
Carmel McSharry, 91, Irish actress (In Sickness and in Health, The Liver Birds, The Man Outside).
Farhang Mehr, 94, Iranian-born American Zoroastrian scholar and writer, Iranian Deputy Prime Minister (1973–1975).
H. Wayne Norman Jr., 62, American politician, member of the Maryland Senate (since 2014) and House of Delegates (2008–2014).
Moe Racine, 80, Canadian Hall of Fame football player (Ottawa Rough Riders).
J. Paul Raines, 53, American retail executive, CEO of GameStop (2010–2017), brain cancer.
Alex Rennie, 69, Scottish football player (St Johnstone, Dundee United) and manager (Stenhousemuir), esophageal cancer.
Ernő Rozgonyi, 84, Hungarian politician, MP (1998–2002, 2010–2014).
Russell Solomon, 92, American retail executive, founder of Tower Records.
José Triana, 87, Cuban poet.
Johan Trondsen, 95, Norwegian politician.

5
Robert Assaraf, 81, Moroccan historian.
Trevor Baylis, 80, British inventor (windup radio).
Derek Bickerton, 91, English-born American linguist and academic.
John Hall Buchanan Jr., 89, American politician, member of the US House of Representatives for Alabama's 6th district (1965–1981), complications from dementia.
Sean Byrne, 80, Irish politician.
John T. Cacioppo, 66, American neuroscientist and psychologist.
Tomas Aguon Camacho, 84, Northern Mariana Islands Roman Catholic prelate, Bishop of Chalan Kanoa (1984–2010).
Mykhaylo Chemberzhi, 73, Ukrainian composer.
Kjerstin Dellert, 92, Swedish opera singer.
Bob Engel, 84, American baseball umpire.
Rafiqul Islam, 82, Bangladeshi physician.
Costakis Koutsokoumnis, 61, Cypriot football administrator, President of CFA (since 2001) and member of FIFA Council (since 2017), cancer.
André S. Labarthe, 86, French actor (Vivre sa vie), film producer and director.
Marcela Lombardo Otero, 91, Mexican politician, Deputy (1976–1979, 1988–1991).
Uri Lubrani, 91, Israeli diplomat and military official.
Paul Magriel, 71, American backgammon and poker player and author, World Backgammon champion (1978).
Helmut Maucher, 90, German food and beverage executive, CEO (1990–1997) and chairman (1990–2000) of Nestlé.
Howard L. Resnikoff, 80, American mathematician.
Gemma Romanyà i Valls, 72, Spanish businesswoman, printer and graphic arts patron.
Jam Saqi, 73, Pakistani politician.
Clive Sinclair, 70, British author, prostate cancer.
D. Sreedevi, 78, Indian judge, member of the Kerala High Court (1997–2001), liver failure.
Clarence F. Stephens, 100, American mathematician and educator.
Stephan Tanneberger, 82, German oncologist and chemist, blood and bone cancer.
Michael Watts, 79, British journalist.
Hayden White, 89, American historian.

6
Arthur Barrett, 73, Jamaican cricketer (West Indies).
Lucie Brock-Broido, 61, American poet and academic, cancer.
Paul Bùi Văn Đọc, 73, Vietnamese Roman Catholic prelate, Archbishop of Ho Chi Minh City (since 2014), stroke.
Donna Butterworth, 62, American actress (Paradise, Hawaiian Style, The Family Jewels) and singer.
William G. Callow, 96, American judge, member of the Wisconsin Supreme Court (1977–1992).
Frank Cappelli, 65, American singer and actor (Cappelli & Company).
Muhibbe Darga, 96, Turkish archeologist.
Aliyu Doma, 75, Nigerian politician, Governor of Nasarawa State (2007–2011).
Peter Freund, 81, Romanian-born American physicist.
Gene Gomes, 72, American judge, member of the California Court of Appeals (since 2002), respiratory disease.
Erivan Haub, 85, German retail executive (Tengelmann Group).
Amani W. A. Kabourou, 68, Tanzanian politician, MP for Kigoma (1995–2015).
John Kurila, 76, Scottish footballer (Northampton Town, Celtic).
Peter Nicholls, 78, Australian writer and editor (The Encyclopedia of Science Fiction).
Octavio Novaro, 78, Mexican physicist specialized in theoretical catalysis, awarded the National Prize for Arts and Sciences (1983) and UNESCO Science Prize (1993).
Francis Piasecki, 66, French football player (Metz, national team) and coach (Strasbourg).
Ferdousi Priyabhashini, 71, Bangladeshi sculptor, heart attack.
Indra Bahadur Rai, 91, Indian writer.
John W. Reed, 99, American legal scholar.
Irving Shain, 92, American chemist and educator, Chancellor of University of Wisconsin-Madison (1977–1986).
Shammi, 88, Indian actress (Dil Apna Aur Preet Parai, Khuda Gawah, Dekh Bhai Dekh).
Zena Skinner, 91, British television chef.
Jeff St John, 71, Australian musician, bacterial infection.
Steve Stroughter, 65, American baseball player (Seattle Mariners).
Sir John Sulston, 75, British biologist, Nobel Prize laureate (2002), stomach cancer.

7
Fortunato Abat, 92, Filipino army general and politician, Secretary of the Department of National Defense (1997–1998).
Reynaldo Bignone, 90, Argentine politician and convicted criminal, President (1982–1983), hip fracture and heart failure.
Gary Burden, 84, American rock album cover artist (After the Gold Rush, Morrison Hotel, Déjà Vu), Grammy winner (2010).
Chen Tien-miao, 89, Taiwanese politician.
Jacques Clemens, 108, Dutch Roman Catholic priest.
Woody Durham, 76, American college basketball radio announcer (North Carolina Tar Heels), complications from primary progressive aphasia.
Hao Bailin, 83, Chinese physicist.
Victor Heringer, 29, Brazilian novelist, translator (First They Killed My Father) and poet, Prêmio Jabuti laureate (2013), suspected suicide by self-defenestration.
Jerzy Milian, 82, Polish jazz vibraphonist.
John Molyneux, 87, English footballer (Chester City, Liverpool).
Antonia La Negra, 82, Spanish cantaora and bailaora, aortic aneurysm.
Chuck Ortmann, 88, American football player (Pittsburgh Steelers, Dallas Texans).
Bill Pulte, 85, American real estate developer (PulteGroup).
Werner Radspieler, 79, German Roman Catholic prelate, Auxiliary Bishop of Bamberg (1986–2013).
Thomas L. Rhodes, 78, American political activist, Parkinson's disease.
Marian Schmidt, 73, Polish artist photographer, mathematician.
Charles Thone, 94, American politician, Governor of Nebraska (1979–1983), member of the US House of Representatives for Nebraska's 1st district (1971–1979).
Kjell Venås, 90, Norwegian philologist.

8
Bernardo Bernardo, 73, Filipino actor, pancreatic cancer.
Ron Franklin, 58, American jockey, Kentucky Derby winner (1979), lung cancer.
John P. Fullam, 96, American federal judge, member of the U.S. District Court for Eastern Pennsylvania (since 1966), presided over Abscam trial.
Sir Wilson Harris, 96, Guyanese writer (Palace of the Peacock).
Antoni Imiela, 63, German-born British serial rapist.
Jean Jolivet, 93, French philosopher.
Milko Kelemen, 93, Croatian composer.
Ralph Keller, 82, Canadian ice hockey player (New York Rangers, Hershey Bears).
Pearse Lyons, 73, Irish biochemist and beverage executive, founder and chairman of Alltech, complications following heart surgery.
Bill Snow, 80, Australian anti-tobacco activist (BUGA UP), ruptured aorta.
Gerd Søraa, 83, Norwegian politician and writer.
Peter Temple, 71, South African-born Australian writer (The Broken Shore, Truth, White Dog), Miles Franklin Award winner (2010), Gold Dagger (2006), cancer.
Albin Vidović, 75, Croatian handball player, Olympic champion (1972).
Togo D. West Jr., 75, American public servant, Secretary of Veterans Affairs (1998–2000), heart attack.
Hal Wick, 73, American politician, member of the South Dakota House of Representatives (1977–1981, 1995–1999, 2001–2009, 2011–2015).
Kate Wilhelm, 89, American author (The Infinity Box, Where Late the Sweet Birds Sang).
Ercan Yazgan, 71, Turkish actor, multiple organ failure.

9
Jerry Anderson, 62, Canadian professional golfer, first Canadian to win on PGA European tour.
Robin Archer, 87, New Zealand rugby union player (national team, Southland, Otago) and coach (Southland).
Joaquin Avila, 69, American civil rights activist and jurist.
Remo Bicchierai, 79, Italian footballer (Catania).
Dennis Furlong, 72, Canadian politician and physician, MLA for Dalhousie-Restigouche East (1999–2003), brain tumour.
Chris Gedney, 47, American football player (Chicago Bears, Arizona Cardinals), suicide.
Vladimir Gerasimov, 28, Russian footballer, traffic collision.
Oskar Gröning, 96, German SS officer and war criminal, guard at Auschwitz concentration camp.
Warren Hawksley, 74, British politician, MP for The Wrekin (1979–1987) and Halesowen and Stourbridge (1992–1997).
Jo Min-ki, 52, South Korean actor (East of Eden, The Cut, The Attorney) and professor, suspected suicide by hanging.
Jung Jae-sung, 35, South Korean badminton player, Olympic bronze medallist (2012), heart attack.
Patangrao Kadam, 74, Indian politician, kidney disease.
Joy Michael, 91, Indian theatre director.
Ulla Nenonen, 84, Finnish missionary and Bible translator.
Adam Ostrowski, 99, Polish World War II RAF officer.
Harold Rosewarne, 87, Australian footballer (South Melbourne).
George A. Sinner, 89, American politician, Governor of North Dakota (1985–1992).
Ethel Stein, 100, American textile artist.
Millie Dunn Veasey, 100, American civil rights activist.
Ion Voinescu, 88, Romanian Olympic footballer (1952).
Elías Yanes Álvarez, 90, Spanish Roman Catholic prelate, Archbishop of Zaragoza (1977–2005).

10
Peter Allday, 90, British Olympic hammer thrower (1952, 1956).
Tony Benneworth, 67, Australian cricketer (Tasmania) and politician, MHA for Bass (1992–1998), boating incident.
Christine Bernardi, 62, French mathematician.
Garech Browne, 78, Irish arts patron, founder of Claddagh Records.
Donald Collins, 92, American politician, member of the Maine Senate (1976–1992) and House of Representatives (1970–1976).
Buddy Cruze, 84, American football player (Chicago Bears, Baltimore Colts, Tennessee Volunteers).
Peter Davies, 60, Australian cricketer.
Michael Gershman, 73, American cinematographer, director and camera operator (Buffy the Vampire Slayer, Crossing Jordan, The Deer Hunter).
Hubert de Givenchy, 91, French fashion designer (Givenchy).
Wally Gould, 79, English footballer (York City, Brighton, Hellenic).
Geoff Hibbins, 88, Australian footballer (St Kilda).
Ken Houston, 64, Canadian ice hockey player (Atlanta Flames, Washington Capitals), cancer.
Bogo Jan, 74, Slovenian Olympic ice hockey player (1964, 1968, 1972).
Ali Asghar Khodadoust, 82, Iranian surgical ophthalmologist, namesake of Khodadoust line, heart disease.
Henry Koffler, 95, Austrian-born American academic, President of the University of Arizona (1982–1991).
Saba Mahmood, 57, Pakistani-born American anthropologist (University of California at Berkeley), pancreatic cancer.
Abubakar Saleh Michika, 77, Nigerian politician, Governor of Adamawa State (1992–1993).
Val Mulkerns, 93, Irish writer and poet.
Roch Pedneault, 90, Canadian Roman Catholic prelate, Auxiliary Bishop of Chicoutimi (1974–2002).
George Rawitscher, 90, German-born American physicist.
Michel Raynaud, 79, French mathematician.
Gene Rhodes, 90, American basketball player (Indianapolis Olympians) and coach (Kentucky Colonels).
Tang Hsiang Chien, 94, Hong Kong industrialist.
Jozef Timmerman, 76, Belgian cyclist.
Ralf Waldmann, 51, German Grand Prix motorcycle road racer.

11
Alba Arnova, 87, Argentine-Italian ballerina and actress (Miracle in Milan, A Slice of Life).
Muhammad Ashiq, 82, Pakistani Olympic racing cyclist (1960, 1964), stroke.
Bob Baxt, 79, Australian jurist, chairman of Trade Practices Commission (1988–1991).
Jean Damascène Bimenyimana, 64, Rwandan Roman Catholic prelate, Bishop of Cyangugu (since 1997).
Baltasar Corrada del Río, 82, Puerto Rican judge and politician, Mayor of San Juan (1985–1989) and Secretary of State (1993–1995).
Peter H. Dailey, 87, American advertising executive and diplomat, Ambassador to Ireland (1982–1984).
John Daly, 81, Australian athletics coach.
Lorenz Dittmann, 89, German art historian.
Sir Ken Dodd, 90, English comedian (Diddy Men), singer ("Tears") and actor (Hamlet), chest infection.
Paddy Donovan, 81, New Zealand Olympic boxer (1956, 1964), British Empire and Commonwealth Games bronze medalist (1958, 1962), and rugby union player (Hawke's Bay).
Luciano Faraguti, 80, Italian politician, Deputy (1979–1994).
Pete James, 60, British archivist.
Cooper H. Langford, 83, American-born Canadian chemist, pancreatic cancer.
Karl Lehmann, 81, German Roman Catholic Cardinal prelate, Bishop of Mainz (1983–2016), complications from a stroke.
Mary LeMessurier, 88, Canadian politician, Alberta MLA (1979–1986).
Graziella Mascia, 64, Italian politician, Deputy (2001–2008).
H. Blair Neatby, 93, Canadian historian.
David W. Noble, 92, American historian.
Stephen A. Orthwein, 72, American polo player and executive, president and chairman of US Polo.
Siegfried Rauch, 85, German actor (Patton, Le Mans, Das Traumschiff), heart failure and injuries sustained in a fall.
Mary Rosenblum, 65, American author (Synthesis & Other Virtual Realities), plane crash.
Charles Sarkis, 78, American restaurateur (Back Bay Restaurant Group) and dog racetrack owner (Wonderland Greyhound Park), complications from brain cancer.
Henri Skiba, 90, French football player (Nîmes, Sochaux) and manager (Grasshoppers).
Alline Banks Sprouse, 96, American basketball player.
Charles D. Strang, 96, American inventor, President of the Outboard Marine Corporation.
Mario Vegetti, 81, Italian historian.
Sándor Záborszky, 83, Hungarian Olympic swimmer (1956).

12
José Arranz, 88, Spanish priest.
Miguel Barceló Pérez, 94, Spanish politician, Senator (since 1986).
José Bernárdez, 82, Spanish cyclist.
Ivan Davis, 86, American classical pianist, stroke.
Nokie Edwards, 82, American Hall of Fame instrumental and surf rock musician (The Ventures), complications from hip surgery.
Ken Flach, 54, American tennis player, Olympic (1988) and Wimbledon champion (1986–1988), complications from pneumonia.
Nikolai Glushkov, 68, Russian businessman (Aeroflot, AutoVAZ), homicide by neck compression.
Sverrir Hermannsson, 88, Icelandic politician, Minister of Industry (1983–1985) and Education (1985–1987).
Kong Bai Ji, 85, Chinese artist.
Craig Mack, 47, American rapper ("Flava in Ya Ear"), heart failure.
Rudolf Mang, 67, German weightlifter, Olympic silver medalist (1972), heart attack.
Henry Minarik, 90, American football player (Pittsburgh Steelers).
Bud Olsen, 77, American basketball player (Seattle SuperSonics, Detroit Pistons).
Charlie Quintana, 56, American rock drummer (Social Distortion, The Plugz, Cracker), heart attack.
Nikki Sievwright, 75, British model and soldier.
Oleg Tabakov, 82, Russian actor (War and Peace, Oblomov), artistic director of the Moscow Art Theatre.
William Teron, 85, Canadian land developer.
Emily Stipes Watts, 81, American literary historian.
Olly Wilson, 80, American composer, musicologist and jazz musician.
Jeremiah Wolfe, 93, American Cherokee elder.

13
Ivano Beggio, 73, Italian transportation executive, President of Aprilia (1969–2004).
Prem Bhatia, 78, Indian cricketer.
T. Berry Brazelton, 99, American pediatrician and author.
Gloria Cordes, 86, American baseball player (Kalamazoo Lassies).
Philip J. Davis, 95, American applied mathematician.
Bebeto de Freitas, 68, Brazilian Olympic volleyball coach (1984) and football manager (Clube Atlético Mineiro), World Championship (1998), heart attack.
Brenda Dean, Baroness Dean of Thornton-le-Fylde, 74, British trade unionist and peer.
Claudia Fontaine, 57, British singer (Afrodiziak) and backing vocalist (Pink Floyd, Elvis Costello).
Hamida Habibullah, 101, Indian politician, member of Rajya Sabha (1976–1982) and MLA for Haidergarh.
Leonid Kvinikhidze, 80, Russian screenwriter and film director (Mary Poppins, Goodbye).
Ken Mulhearn, 72, British footballer (Shrewsbury Town, Stockport County, Manchester City).
Emily Nasrallah, 86, Lebanese writer and women's rights activist.
Jens Nilsson, 69, Swedish politician, MEP (since 2011), Chairman of Östersund Municipality (1997–2009).
J. L. Parks, 90, American basketball player (Oklahoma State Cowboys).
Dave Ragan, 82, American professional golfer.
Nora Schimming-Chase, 77, Namibian politician and diplomat, member of the National Assembly (since 2000), ambassador to Germany, Austria and Tanzania, cancer.
Aldo Tarlao, 91, Italian rower, Olympic silver medalist (1948).
Václav Verner, 68, Czech speedway rider.
Gordon Walgren, 85, American politician, member of the Washington House of Representatives (1966), member of the Washington State Senate (1967–1980).
Katherine Westphal, 99, American textile designer.
Henry Williams, 47, American basketball player (Charlotte 49ers, Scaligera Verona, Benetton Treviso, Virtus Roma), world championship bronze medalist (1990), kidney failure.
Jimmy Wisner, 86, American pianist, producer and songwriter.

14
Robert L. Bireley, 84, American historian.
Jim Bowen, 80, English television presenter (Bullseye) and comedian (The Comedians).
Alfred W. Crosby, 87, American ecological historian, complications from Parkinson's disease.
Halit Deringör, 95, Turkish footballer (Fenerbahçe).
Emilio Disi, 75, Argentine actor (Todas las azafatas van al cielo, La Aventura explosiva, Muerte en Buenos Aires) and humorist, lung cancer.
Elusive Quality, 25, American racehorse, euthanized.
Peter Entwisle, 69, English-born New Zealand art historian.
Marielle Franco, 38, Brazilian politician, member of the Municipal Chamber of Rio de Janeiro (since 2017), shot.
Rubén Galván, 65, Argentine footballer (national team, Club Atlético Independiente, Estudiantes), cirrhosis.
Stephen Hawking, 76, English theoretical physicist, professor (University of Cambridge) and writer (A Brief History of Time), complications from amyotrophic lateral sclerosis.
Narendra Jha, 55, Indian actor (Raees, Haider, Raavan), heart attack.
Palle Kjærulff-Schmidt, 86, Danish film director (Once There Was a War) and screenwriter.
Lefty Kreh, 93, American sports photojournalist, author and sport fisherman.
Adrian Lamo, 37, American computer hacker (WikiLeaks).
Steve Mandell, 76, American bluegrass guitarist and banjoist, prostate cancer.
David Matza, 87, American sociologist and criminologist.
Mac McCallion, 67, New Zealand rugby union player (Counties, New Zealand Māori) and coach (Counties Manukau, Fiji), cancer.
Liam O'Flynn, 72, Irish uilleann piper (Planxty), cancer.
Pijuan, 75, Puerto Rican pianist.
Ronald Rotunda, 73, American legal scholar, pneumonia.
Petar Stipetić, 80, Croatian military officer, Armed Forces Chief of Staff (2000–2002).
Tawfiq Titingan, 55, Malaysian politician, MLA, colon cancer.
Vasantha Vaidyanathan, 80, Sri Lankan Hindu activist and radio broadcaster.
David Wyman, 89, American historian (The Abandonment of the Jews).

15
Francis M. Bator, 92, Hungarian-American economist and educator.
Tom Benson, 90, American automobile dealer, philanthropist and sports franchise owner (New Orleans Saints, New Orleans Pelicans), influenza.
Stan Brown, 76, English footballer (Fulham).
Ed Charles, 84, American baseball player (New York Mets, Kansas City Athletics).
Bev Desjarlais, 62, Canadian politician, MP for Churchill (1997–2004), multiple system atrophy as a complication of Parkinson's disease.
Erwin C. Dietrich, 87, Swiss film producer (The Wild Geese).
Augie Garrido, 79, American college baseball coach (Cal State Fullerton, Texas), stroke.
Carlton Gary, 67, American serial killer and rapist, executed by lethal injection.
Michael Getler, 82, American journalist (The Washington Post, The New York Times International Edition, PBS), complications from bile duct cancer.
Robert Grossman, 78, American painter, sculptor, filmmaker and author.
Jørgen Hansen, 74, Danish Olympic boxer (1968).
Huang Wenpan, 22, Chinese swimmer, Paralympic champion (2016), traffic collision.
Larry Kwong, 94, Canadian ice hockey player (Valleyfield Braves, New York Rangers), first player to break NHL's colour barrier.
Bronson La Follette, 82, American politician, Wisconsin Attorney General (1965–1969, 1975–1987).
Ling Yun, 100, Chinese politician, 1st Minister of Public Security (1983–1985).
Don Mecklem, 91, Australian Olympic hockey player. 
Eric Munshaw, 64, Canadian Olympic slalom canoer (1972).
Franz Oberwinkler, 78, German mycologist.
Bob Phibbs, 90, Canadian Olympic basketball player (1952).
Gwilym Roberts, 89, British politician, MP (1966–1970, 1974–1983).
Mohamed Sayah, 84, Tunisian politician.

16
Félix Arámbulo, 76, Paraguayan footballer.
Betty Ann Bowser, 73, American journalist (PBS NewsHour), pneumonia.
John Brookes, 84, British landscape designer.
Anna Campbell, 26, British feminist and soldier, airstrike.
Barrie Clark, 85, Canadian politician and broadcaster.
Guy Cury, 87, French Olympic hurdler (1956).
Russell Freedman, 88, American biographer and children's writer.
Leslie Gonda, 98, Hungarian-born American aircraft leasing executive (International Lease Finance Corporation).
Boyukagha Hajiyev, 59, Azerbaijani football player and manager (Araz-Naxçıvan, Neftçi), complications from a heart attack.
Tankmar Horn, 93, Finnish diplomat and business executive (Wärtsilä).
Guðjón Arnar Kristjánsson, 73, Icelandic politician, MP (1999–2009), cancer.
Otomar Kvěch, 67, Czech composer.
Kwon Hee-deok, 61, South Korean voice actress and writer.
Arnie Lerma, 67, American writer and Scientology whistleblower, suicide by gunshot.
Adrian Lillebekk Ovlien, 20, Norwegian footballer (Kongsvinger), sepsis.
Dayton S. Mak, 100, American diplomat, Ambassador to Kuwait (1961–1963).
Aidan Maloney, 97, Canadian politician, MHA for Ferryland (1966–1971).
Magoroh Maruyama, 88, Japanese-born American business theorist.
Milán Matos, 68, Cuban Olympic long jumper (1972, 1976).
George Meek, 84, Scottish footballer (Leeds United, Walsall).
Jane Moffet, 87, American baseball player (AAGPBL).
Buell Neidlinger, 82, American cellist and bassist, heart attack.
Ezequiel Orozco, 29, Mexican footballer, lung cancer.
Lisa Garcia Quiroz, 57, American media executive (Time Warner), pancreatic cancer.
Lucien A. Schmit Jr., 89, American engineer.
Louise Slaughter, 88, American politician, member of the US House of Representatives for New York's 25th district (since 1987), complications from a fall.
Raymond Wilson, 89, British physicist.
Charles Yanofsky, 92, American geneticist.
Marilyn J. Ziffrin, 91, American composer.

17
Sir William Aldous, 82, British jurist, Lord Justice of Appeal (1995–2003).
Karen Anderson, 85, American writer.
Arnold Burden, 95, Canadian physician, helped rescue survivors in the 1956 and 1958 Springhill mining disasters.
Dexter Davies, 66, Australian politician, member of the Western Australian Legislative Council (1998–2001), lung cancer.
Nicholas Edwards, Baron Crickhowell, 84, British politician, Secretary of State for Wales (1979–1987).
Geneviève Fontanel, 81, French actress (The Man Who Loved Women).
Benny Fredriksson, 58, Swedish actor and theatre director, CEO of Stockholm City Theatre (2002–2017), suicide.
Peter Haynes, 92, British Anglican priest, Dean of Hereford (1982–1992).
Jim Hendricks, 68, American actor and DJ (Commander USA's Groovie Movies).
Mike MacDonald, 62, Canadian comedian and actor (The Ripping Friends, Screwballs II), heart complications.
Zdeněk Mahler, 89, Czech pedagogue, writer, publicist and musicologist.
Phan Văn Khải, 84, Vietnamese politician, Prime Minister (1997–2006).
Greg Polis, 67, Canadian ice hockey player (Pittsburgh Penguins, New York Rangers, Washington Capitals), cancer.
Sushil Siddharth, 59, Indian writer, complications from a heart attack.
Sammy Williams, 69, American actor (A Chorus Line), Tony winner (1976), cancer.
Za Hlei Thang, 75, Burmese politician.

18
Michel Adama-Tamboux, 89, Central African politician, President of the National Assembly (1960–1966).
Chuck Arrobio, 73, American football player (Minnesota Vikings).
Cloria Brown, 75, American politician, member of the Missouri House of Representatives (2011–2013, since 2015), cancer.
Sergio Castellaneta, 86, Italian politician, member of the Chamber of Deputies (1992–1996).
David Cooper, 68, Australian immunologist and medical researcher (HIV), President of the International AIDS Society (1994–1998).
Samuel Epstein, 91, English-born American physician, cardiac arrest.
Barkat Gourad Hamadou, 88, Djiboutian politician, Prime Minister (1978–2001).
Michal Horský, 74, Slovak political scientist and politician, member of the House of the People (1990–1992).
Killjoy, 48, American singer (Necrophagia).
Helmut Kuckelkorn, 81, German cyclist.
Li Ao, 82, Chinese-Taiwanese writer and politician, MLY (2005–2008), brain tumour.
Georgi Mosolov, 91, Russian test pilot.
Jean-Baptiste Natama, 53, Burkinabé politician and diplomat.
Stefano Pellegrini, 64, Italian footballer (Roma, Bari).
Otoniel Quintana, 71, Colombian Olympic footballer (1968).
Ivor Richard, Baron Richard, 85, British politician and diplomat, Lord Privy Seal (1997–1998), ambassador to UN (1974–1979), MP for Barons Court (1964–1974).
Michael Rutschky, 74, German author.
Jerry Schoonmaker, 84, American baseball player (Washington Senators).
Hazel Smith, 83, American country music journalist, publicist, and singer-songwriter, heart failure.
Clive Ulyate, 84, South African rugby player and cricketer.
Sir James Weatherall, 82, British vice-admiral and Marshal of the Diplomatic Corps.
John F. Wright, 72, American state judge, member of the Nebraska Supreme Court (since 1994) and Court of Appeals (1991–1994).

19
Roger G. Barry, 82, British-born American geographer and climatologist, director of the National Snow and Ice Data Center (1976–2008).
Irina Beglyakova, 85, Russian athlete, Olympic silver medalist (1956).
Linda Bement, 76, American model, winner of Miss Universe 1960.
Madge Bester, 54, South African disability rights activist, once world's shortest woman.
David Bischoff, 66, American novelist and television writer (Star Trek: The Next Generation).
Howard Clendaniel, 85, American politician, member of the Delaware House of Representatives.
Sue England, 89, American actress (City Across the River, The Women of Pitcairn Island).
Julio Garrett, 92, Bolivian politician, lawyer and ambassador, Foreign Minister (1979–1980) and Vice President (1985–1989).
Sir Andrew Gilbart, 68, British High Court judge, cancer.
Hasan Celal Güzel, 73, Turkish journalist and politician.
Arnold R. Hirsch, 69, American historian, Lewy body dementia.
Irwin Hoffman, 93, American conductor.
Chaim Samuel Hönig, 92, Brazilian mathematician.
Nicolás Kingman Riofrío, 99, Ecuadorian journalist, writer and politician.
Jürg Laederach, 72, Swiss writer.
Jean Michel Larrasket, 67, French engineer and professor (University of Pau and Pays de l'Adour, Mondragón University).
Dick LeMay, 79, American baseball player (San Francisco Giants, Chicago Cubs).
Stanley Lieberson, 84, Canadian-born American sociologist.
Luo Fu, 89, Taiwanese poet.
Anil Malnad, 60, Indian film editor (Sitaara, Anveshana), blood clot.
Aghasi Manukyan, 51, Armenian Olympic wrestler (1996), world champion (1993).
Keith O'Brien, 80, Scottish Roman Catholic Cardinal, Archbishop of St Andrews and Edinburgh (1985–2013), complications from a fall.
Les Payne, 76, American journalist (Newsday), Pulitzer Prize (1974).
Moishe Postone, 75, Canadian Western Marxist historian, philosopher and political economist, cancer.
Kedarnath Singh, 83, Indian poet.
Sudan, 45, Kenyan northern white rhinoceros, last known male of his subspecies, euthanized.
Thunder Gulch, 25, American racehorse, Kentucky Derby winner (1995), euthanized.
Jacobus Verhoeff, 91, Dutch mathematician.
Viktor Yerin, 74, Russian military officer, Minister of Internal Affairs (1992–1995).

20
Dilbar Abdurahmonova, 81, Uzbekistani conductor, violinist and teacher, People's Artist of the USSR (1977).
Ann-Charlotte Alverfors, 71, Swedish author.
Katie Boyle, 91, Italian-born British actress, television personality and game-show panelist.
Ariel Bybee, 75, American operatic mezzo-soprano.
João Calvão da Silva, 66, Portuguese politician, MP for Coimbra (1995–1999), Minister of Internal Administration (2015).
Kak Channthy, 38, Cambodian space rock singer, traffic collision.
Paul Colin, 97, French novelist.
Peter "Mars" Cowling, 72, British bassist (Pat Travers Band).
John Donaldson, 92, American football player (Chicago Hornets, Los Angeles Dons).
Tom Griffin, 72, American playwright (The Boys Next Door).
Siringan Gubat, 68, Malaysian politician, MP for Ranau (2004–2008), MLA (1990–2004, 2013–2018), heart attack.
Ramon Deleon Guerrero, 71, Northern Mariana Islands politician, Senator (2000–2004).
Gurbaksh Singh Khalsa, 52, Indian Sikh rights activist, suicide by jumping.
C. K. Mann, 81–82, Ghanaian highlife musician.
Dylan Mika, 45, New Zealand rugby union player (Samoa national team, New Zealand national team, Auckland), heart attack.
Bobby Mitchell, 75, American golfer.
Sergio Peña Clos, 90, Puerto Rican politician, member of the Senate of Puerto Rico (1980–2004).
Peter G. Peterson, 91, American financier (Lehman Brothers), co-founder of The Blackstone Group, Secretary of Commerce (1972–1973).
Yuri Shatalov, 72, Russian ice hockey player (Krylya Sovetov Moscow).
Deo Kumar Singh, 67, Indian Maoist leader and insurgent commander, heart attack.
William Smith, 89, American wrestler, Olympic champion (1952).
Ayaz Soomro, 59, Pakistani politician, MNA (since 2013), MPA for Larkana (2002–2013), heart disease.
Joseph M. Sussman, 78, American engineer.
Emmett Hulcy Tidd, 94, American military officer.

21
Anna-Lisa, 84, Norwegian actress (Black Saddle, Have Rocket, Will Travel).
Kakon Bibi, c. 102, Bangladeshi spy and freedom fighter.
Gerrit Blaauw, 93, Dutch computer scientist.
Dejan Bravničar, 80, Slovene violinist.
George H. Emert, 79, American biochemist, President of Utah State University (1992–2000).
Frank Gaylord, 93, American sculptor.
Tom Higgins, 73, American rock climber.
Ulrica Hydman Vallien, 79, Swedish artist, heart attack.
James C. Irwin, 88, American military officer, Vice Commandant of the U.S. Coast Guard (1986–1988).
Rolf Leeser, 88, Dutch footballer (Ajax) and fashion designer.
Paul Edward Plunkett, 82, American federal judge, member of the U.S. District Court for Northern Illinois (1982–1998).
John W. Vogt, 81, American politician, member of the Florida Senate (1972–1988), interstitial fibrosis.
Peter Waddington, 71, British sociologist and police officer, cardiac arrest.
Martha Wallner, 90, Austrian actress (The Street).
Dick Wilmarth, 75, American dog musher, winner of the 1973 Iditarod, cancer.
Leo C. Zeferetti, 90, American politician, member of the U.S. House of Representatives from New York's 15th congressional district (1975-1983).

22
Fergus Anckorn, 99, British magician, longest-serving member of The Magic Circle, bladder cancer.
Michael Barnes, 85, British politician, MP for Brentford and Chiswick (1966–1974).
Khozh-Akhmed Bersanov, 91, Russian Chechen writer and ethnographer.
Morgan Chua, 68, Singaporean cartoonist.
Jose Flores, 57, Peruvian-born American jockey, injuries sustained in racing fall.
Dick Gamble, 89, Canadian hockey player (Montreal Canadiens, Toronto Maple Leafs, Rochester Americans).
Paul Green, 94, American electrical engineer.
James F. Holland, 92, American physician.
René Houseman, 64, Argentine footballer, tongue cancer.
Wayne Huizenga, 80, American entrepreneur (Blockbuster) and sports team owner (Miami Dolphins, Florida Panthers), cancer.
Johan van Hulst, 107, Dutch politician, author and academic, awarded Righteous Among the Nations (1970), member of the Senate (1956–1981) and the European Parliament (1961–1968).
Jan Kantůrek, 69, Czech translator.
Morgana King, 87, American jazz singer and actress (The Godfather), non-Hodgkin's lymphoma.
Charles Lazarus, 94, American entrepreneur and executive (Toys "R" Us), respiratory failure.
Lyn Lott, 67, American golfer, complications from brain surgery.
Carlos Eduardo Miranda, 56, Brazilian musician, record producer and reality television judge (Ídolos, Qual é o Seu Talento?, Esse Artista Sou Eu).
Morten Piil, 75, Danish film critic.
Michael J. Reynolds, 78, Canadian actor (Gorillas in the Mist, United 93, Leap Year).
Dariush Shayegan, 83, Iranian cultural theorist and philosopher, stroke.
Nicholas Tsoucalas, 91, American judge, member of the Court of International Trade (1986–1996), pneumonia.

23
Paul L. Anderson, 71, American architect, heart attack.
Glen Ash, 86, American actor.
Don Ball, 81, American builder and philanthropist.
Mike Beedle, 55, American software engineer, stabbed.
Lino Bortolo Belotti, 87, Italian Roman Catholic prelate, Auxiliary Bishop of Bergamo (1999–2009).
DuShon Monique Brown, 49, American actress (Chicago Fire, Prison Break, Unexpected), sepsis.
Ernie Burrington, 91, British newspaper editor and journalist.
Raymond Butt, 77, British schoolteacher, pancreatic cancer.
Debbie Lee Carrington, 58, American actress and stuntwoman (Return of the Jedi, Total Recall, Bride of Chucky).
Hasili, 27, French racehorse.
Murray S. Hoffman, 93, American cardiologist.
Philip Kerr, 62, British author (March Violets, Children of the Lamp, A Philosophical Investigation).
Dan Lanphear, 80, American football player (Houston Oilers).
Jukka Mikkola, 74, Finnish politician, MP (1983–1986, 1995–2003).
Zell Miller, 86, American politician, Governor of Georgia (1991–1999), member of the U.S. Senate (2000–2005), Parkinson's disease.
Alberto Ongaro, 92, Italian journalist and writer.
Jaakko Pakkasvirta, 83, Finnish film director and screenwriter.
Aileen Paterson, 83, Scottish writer and illustrator.
Idowu Sofola, 83, Nigerian jurist.
Ephraim Stern, 84, Israeli archaeologist.
Delores Taylor, 85, American actress and screenwriter (Billy Jack), complications of dementia.
Seán Treacy, 94, Irish politician, TD (1961–1997), Ceann Comhairle (1973–1977, 1987–1997).
John Welchli, 89, American rower, Olympic silver medalist (1956).

24
José Antonio Abreu, 78, Venezuelan conductor and politician, founder of El Sistema.
Arnold Andenmatten, 95, Swiss military patrol skier, winner of the Olympic demonstration event (1948).
Lys Assia, 94, Swiss singer, winner of the first Eurovision Song Contest (1956).
Rim Banna, 51, Palestinian singer, composer and activist, breast cancer.
Arnaud Beltrame, 44, French gendarme, stabbed.
Jeff Cooper, 82, Canadian actor (Dallas, Circle of Iron, The Born Losers).
Bernie De Koven, 76, American video game designer (Alien Garden), lung cancer.
John Ehle, 92, American writer.
Rudresh Gowda, 62, Indian politician, member of the Lok Sabha from Hassan (1996–1997), Karnataka MLA from Belur, Karnataka (since 2008), heart attack.
John Hsu, 86, Chinese-born American violist.
Hassan Muhammed Lawal, 63, Nigerian politician.
Bill Lucas, 101, British RAF officer and Olympic long-distance runner (1948).
Joe Malone, 94, Australian footballer (North Melbourne).
Frank Meisler, 89, German-born Israeli architect and sculptor (Kindertransport – The Arrival).
Hidetoshi Nagasawa, 77, Japanese sculptor and architect.
Carl Scheib, 91, American baseball player (Philadelphia Athletics, St. Louis Cardinals).
Marco Solfrini, 60, Italian basketball player, Olympic silver medalist (1980), heart attack.
Arthur Tafoya, 85, American Roman Catholic prelate, Bishop of Pueblo (1980–2009).
Mely Tagasa, 82, Filipino actress, stroke.
Michael Voigt, American sport shooter, handgun world champion (1999), cancer.
James Wickstrom, 75, American radio host and white supremacist.
Alvin Wright, 57, American football player (Los Angeles Rams).

25
Bob Biderman, 77–78, British-American novelist. (death announced on this date)
André Bourbeau, 81, Canadian politician, MNA for Laporte (1981–2003), Mayor of Saint-Lambert, Quebec (1978–1981), cancer.
Jules-Aristide Bourdes-Ogouliguende, 80, Gabonese politician, Speaker of the National Assembly (1990–1993).
Linda Carol Brown, 75, American equality campaigner, involved in Brown v. Board of Education.
Edwin Carr, 89, Australian Olympic sprinter (1952), dual Commonwealth champion (1950).
William W. Cates, 78, American writer and vintner.
David Cobham, 87, British film director (Tarka the Otter), stroke.
Anton Jože Gale, 73, Slovenian Olympic ice hockey player (1964, 1968, 1972).
Mike Harrison, 72, British singer (Spooky Tooth).
Desmond Lewis, 72, Jamaican cricketer (West Indies).
Vicente Ramón Hernández Peña, 82, Venezuelan Roman Catholic prelate, Bishop of Trujillo (1982–2012).
Mel Rosen, 90, American track and field coach (Auburn Tigers).
Seo Min-woo, 33, South Korean singer (100%).
Nicolae Tilihoi, 61, Romanian footballer (Universitatea Craiova).
Dagfinn Vårvik, 93, Norwegian politician, leader of the Centre Party (1973–1977), Minister of Finance (1963–1963) and Foreign Affairs (1972–1973).
Olle Widestrand, 85, Swedish musician and composer.
Jerry Williams, 75, Swedish singer, cancer.

26
Fouad al-Zayat, 77, Syrian businessman, cancer.
Patricia Burton, 85, American baseball player (Fort Wayne Daisies).
Sándor Demján, 74, Hungarian entrepreneur (TriGranit).
Mamadou Diop, 81, Senegalese politician, Mayor of Dakar (1984–2002).
António dos Santos, 85, Portuguese Roman Catholic prelate, Bishop of Guarda (1979–2005).
Sir John Grimley Evans, 81, British gerontologist.
Fabrizio Frizzi, 60, Italian television presenter (L'eredità), cerebral hemorrhage.
Nikolay Kaufman, 92, Bulgarian musicologist, folklorist and composer.
Sergei Mavrodi, 62, Russian financial fraudster, member of State Duma (1994–1995), heart attack.
William Plant, 73, Jamaican Olympic sailor.
Probosutedjo, 87, Indonesian businessman, thyroid cancer.
Fernand Steenacker, 87, Belgian Olympic rower (1956).
Zeke Upshaw, 26, American basketball player (Grand Rapids Drive), hypertrophic cardiomyopathy.
Sir Michael Wheeler-Booth, 84, British public servant, Clerk of the Parliaments (1991–1997).

27
Stéphane Audran, 85, French actress (The Discreet Charm of the Bourgeoisie, Babette's Feast, The Big Red One).
Benjamin Bassin, 74, Finnish diplomat.
Jane Smisor Bastien, 82, American educator and piano teacher.
Chan Sui-kau, 91, Hong Kong industrialist and philanthropist.
José Hugo Garaycoa Hawkins, 87, Peruvian Roman Catholic prelate, Bishop of Tacna y Moquegua (1991–2006).
Frank Hodgetts, 93, English footballer (West Bromwich Albion, Millwall).
David Humm, 65, American football player (Oakland Raiders, Baltimore Colts), complications from multiple sclerosis.
Aimée Iacobescu, 71, Romanian actress (The Doom), breast cancer.
Luc Jalabert, 66, French rejoneador.
Victor Kalashnikov, 75, Russian gun designer (PP-19 Bizon).
Tom Martin, 69, American politician, Mayor of Lubbock, Texas (2008–2012).
Sir Eric McClintock, 99, Australian businessman and public servant, chairman of Woolworths Limited (1980–1987).
Jerry Moses, 71, American baseball player (Boston Red Sox, Detroit Tigers).
Bert Nievera, 81, Filipino-American singer.
Kenny O'Dell, 73, American country singer-songwriter ("Behind Closed Doors", "Mama He's Crazy"), Grammy winner (1974).
James "Quick" Parker, 60, American-Canadian football player (BC Lions, Edmonton Eskimos).
Rosendo Rodriguez, 38, American convicted rapist and murderer, execution by lethal injection.
Archibald "Archie" Mncedisi Sibeko, 90, South African anti-apartheid activist.
Louise A. Tilly, 87, American historian.
Robert Hugh Willoughby, 96, American flautist.

28
Oleg Anofriyev, 87, Russian actor, singer, songwriter, film director and poet.
Armand Arabian, 83, American jurist, Supreme Court of California (1990–1996).
Kateryna Boloshkevich, 78, Ukrainian weaver and statesperson.
Bobby Ferguson, 80, English football player (Derby County) and manager (Ipswich Town).
Wolfgang Girardi, 89, Austrian Olympic gymnast.
Travis Hill, 48, American football player (Cleveland Browns).
Walter E. Johnston III, 82, American politician.
Peter Munk, 90, Hungarian-born Canadian mine owner (Barrick Gold) and philanthropist (Toronto General Hospital).
Stanisław Paździor, 73, Polish footballer
Clarence Pettersen, 65, Canadian politician, member of the Legislative Assembly of Manitoba (2011–2016).
William Prochnau, 80, American journalist, coronary artery disease.
Catherine Pym, 96, Australian Olympic fencer (1952).
Lívia Rév, 101, Hungarian pianist.
Eugène Van Roosbroeck, 89, Belgian racing cyclist, Olympic champion (1948).
Clément Rosset, 78, French philosopher and writer.
Caleb Scofield, 39, American rock bassist and singer (Cave In, Zozobra, Old Man Gloom), traffic collision.
Daryl Thomas, 52, American basketball player (Indiana Hoosiers), heart attack.
Mike Tucker, 73, British equestrian rider and commentator.
Norm Wilson, 83, New Zealand cricketer (Northern Districts).

29
David Bartov, 94, Polish-born Israeli judge.
R. J. Berry, 83, British geneticist and theistic evolutionist, stroke.
Dexter Bristol, 57, Grenadian immigrant to the United Kingdom.
Jim Callaghan, 91, British politician, MP for Middleton and Prestwich (1974–1983) and Heywood and Middleton (1983–1997).
Don Colpoys, 83, American baseball coach and manager (Buffalo Bisons).
Corrado dal Fabbro, 72, Italian bobsledder, Olympic silver medalist (1972).
Geoffrey Dodsworth, 89, British banker and politician, MP for South West Hertfordshire (1974–1979).
Sir William Gladstone, 7th Baronet, 92, British aristocrat and Chief Scout (1972–1982).
Colin Harper, 71, English footballer (Ipswich Town).
Ron Mailer, 85, Scottish footballer (Dunfermline Athletic).
Emiliano Mondonico, 71, Italian football manager (Torino, Atalanta, Fiorentina), stomach cancer.
Walter Pérez Villamonte, 81, Bolivian Roman Catholic prelate, Bishop of Potosí (1998–2009).
Pollyanna Pickering, 75, British wildlife artist.
Stephen Reinhardt, 87, American judge, U.S. Court of Appeals for the Ninth Circuit (since 1980), heart attack.
Ed Samcoff, 93, American baseball player (Philadelphia Athletics).
Mohamed Shaker, 84, Egyptian diplomat, member of Board of Governors of the International Atomic Energy Agency (1986–1998) and Ambassador to the UK (1988–1997).
Anita Shreve, 71, American author (The Pilot's Wife, The Weight of Water, Stella Bain), cancer.
Sven-Olov Sjödelius, 84, Swedish canoer, Olympic champion (1960, 1964).
Rusty Staub, 73, American baseball player (New York Mets, Montreal Expos, Detroit Tigers), multiple organ failure.
Enrique Troncoso Troncoso, 80, Chilean Roman Catholic prelate, Bishop of Iquique (1989–2000) and Melipilla (2000–2014).
Paul Van Arsdale, 97, American hammered dulcimer player.

30
Alias, 41, American rapper, producer and record label founder (Anticon), heart attack.
Patrick Atiyah, 87, English legal scholar.
Samuel Belzberg, 89, Canadian financier, complications from a stroke.
Aureliano Bolognesi, 87, Italian boxer, Olympic champion (1952).
Sharon Brehm, 72, American psychologist, Chancellor of Indiana University Bloomington (2001–2003), complications from Alzheimer's disease.
Ivan Čaklec, 85, Croatian Olympic gymnast.
Anna Chennault, 92, Chinese-born American journalist and businesswoman.
Saul Cherniack, 101, Canadian politician, Manitoba Minister of Finance (1969–1972, 1973–1975).
Saunders Davies, 80, British Anglican prelate, Bishop of Bangor (2000–2004).
André Duval, 97, French-Canadian author and historian.
Josie Farrington, Baroness Farrington of Ribbleton, 77, British politician, life peer (since 1994).
Ivor Forbes Guest, 97, British historian and writer.
Philip Gulliver, 96, British-born Canadian anthropologist.
Drue Heinz, 103, American literary publisher (The Paris Review) and patron (Drue Heinz Literature Prize).
Henry Theophilus Howaniec, 87, American Roman Catholic prelate, Bishop of Most Holy Trinity in Almaty (1999–2011).
Daisy Kadibil, 95, Australian Aboriginal woman, inspiration for the film Rabbit Proof Fence, dementia.
Sabahudin Kurt, 82, Bosnian folk and pop singer ("Život je sklopio krug").
André Bo-Boliko Lokonga, 83, Congolese politician, Speaker of the National Assembly (1970–1979) and Prime Minister (1979–1980).
Bill Maynard, 89, English actor (Heartbeat, Confessions of a Window Cleaner, Carry On), complications from a fall.
Nacho Pérez Frías, 62, Spanish footballer (CD Málaga) and sports physician, complications of burns.
Alexander Pylcyn, 94, Russian military officer.
Wolfgang Schilling, 62, German football player (Arminia Bielefeld, Tennis Borussia Berlin) and manager (Berliner AK 07).
Marcel Storme, 87, Belgian legal scholar and politician.
Michael Tree, 84, American violist.
Jean-Guy Trépanier, 86, Canadian politician.
La Wilson, 93, American artist, stroke.

31
Frank Aendenboom, 76, Belgian actor.
Margarita Carrera, 88, Guatemalan philosopher, professor and writer.
Luigi De Filippo, 87, Italian actor (Non è vero... ma ci credo, You're on Your Own, Love Italian Style).
Chris Edwards, 41, British boxer, heart attack.
John Mack Flanagan, 71, American disc jockey (KFRC), heart failure.
Charles Goodwin, 74, American linguistic anthropologist and semiotician, cancer.
Ted J. Land, 81, American politician, member of the Georgia State Senate (1979–1990).
Peg Lautenschlager, 62, American attorney and politician, Attorney General of Wisconsin (2003–2007), member of the Wisconsin State Assembly (1989–1993), breast cancer.
James McAlister, 66, American football player (Philadelphia Eagles), cancer.
Jan Snoeck, 91, Dutch sculptor.
Leonard D. Wexler, 93, American judge (U.S. District Court for the Eastern District of New York).

References

2018-03
 03